Niobium(V) fluoride, also known as niobium pentafluoride, is the inorganic compound with the formula NbF5.  The solid consists of tetramers [NbF5]4.  It is a colorless solid that is rarely used.

Preparation and reactions
Niobium pentafluoride is obtained by treatment of any niobium compound with fluorine:
2 Nb  +  5 F2   →  2 NbF5
2 NbCl5  +  5 F2   →  2 NbF5  +  5 Cl2

It reacts with hydrogen fluoride to give H2NbF7, a superacid.

Related compounds
In hydrofluoric acid, NbF5 converts to [NbF7]2- and [NbF5O]2-.  The relative solubility of these potassium salts and related tantalum fluorides is the basis of the Marignac process for separation of Nb and Ta.

NbCl5 forms a dimeric structure (edge-shared bioctahedron) in contrast to the corner-shared tetrameric structure of the fluoride.

External links
 NIST Standard Reference Database

References

Niobium(V) compounds
Fluorides
Metal halides